An International XI cricket team toured several countries from February to April 1962 and played a total of eight first-class matches, these taking place in Kenya, Northern Rhodesia (now Zambia), Southern Rhodesia (now Zimbabwe), East Pakistan (now Bangladesh), New Zealand, India and Pakistan. The International XI was captained initially by West Indian Everton Weekes and later Australian Richie Benaud.

Squad
The following players played one or more matches for the International XI

Tour schedule
10 Feb 1962 - vs East Africa at Nairobi
14 Feb 1962 - vs HA Collins' XI at Athletic Club, Nakuru
17 Feb 1962 - vs Rhodesia at Ek Park, Kitwe 
21 Feb 1962 - vs Rhodesia Country Districts at Country Club, Ruwa
24 Feb 1962 - vs Rhodesia at Showground, Bulawayo
28 Feb 1962 - vs Rhodesia Colts at Que Que Sports Club, Que Que 
3 Mar 1962 - vs Rhodesian Invitation XI at Police A Ground, Salisbury
6 Mar 1962 - vs Kenya at Nairobi
10 Mar 1962 - vs East Pakistan Governor's XI at Dacca Stadium, Dacca
16 Mar 1962 - vs New Zealand XI at Lancaster Park, Christchurch
20 Mar 1962 - vs Wellington at Basin Reserve, Wellington
22 Mar 1962 - vs New Zealand Cricket Council President's XI at Eden Park, Auckland
27 Mar 1962 - vs Hong Kong Island XI at Hong Kong Cricket Club Ground, Hong Kong
28 Mar 1962 - vs Hong Kong Mainland XI at Hong Kong Cricket Club Ground, Hong Kong
29 Mar 1962 - vs Hong Kong at Hong Kong Cricket Club Ground, Hong Kong
31 Mar 1962 - vs Cricket Club of India President's XI at Brabourne Stadium, Bombay
6 Apr 1962 - vs BCCP XI at National Stadium, Karachi

vs East Africa

vs Rhodesia

vs Rhodesia

vs Rhodesian Invitation XI

vs East Pakistan Governor's XI

vs New Zealand XI

vs Wellington

vs New Zealand President's XI

vs India President's XI

vs BCCP XI

References

1962 in Indian cricket
1962 in New Zealand cricket
1962 in Northern Rhodesia
1962 in Pakistani cricket
1962 in Southern Rhodesia
1962 in Kenyan cricket
1962
1962
1962
1962
1962
1962
International cricket competitions from 1960–61 to 1970
Indian cricket seasons from 1945–46 to 1969–70
New Zealand cricket seasons from 1945–46 to 1969–70
Pakistani cricket seasons from 1947–48 to 1969–70